Lead(II) bromide is the inorganic compound with the formula PbBr2. It is a white powder.  It is produced in the burning of typical leaded gasolines.

Preparation and properties
It is typically prepared from treating solutions of lead salts (e.g., (lead(II) nitrate) with bromide salts.  This process exploits its low solubility in water - only 0.455 g dissolves in 100 g of water at 0 °C. It is about ten times more soluble in boiling water.

PbBr2 has the same crystal structure as lead chloride (cotunnite) – they are isomorphous. In this structure, Pb2+ is surrounded by nine Br− ions in a distorted tricapped trigonal prismatic geometry. Seven of the Pb-Br distances are shorter, in the range 2.9-3.3 Å, while two of them are longer at 3.9 Å. The coordination is therefore sometimes described as (7+2).

Lead bromide was prevalent in the environment as the result of the use of leaded gasoline.  Tetraethyl lead was once widely used to improve the combustion properties of gasoline. To prevent the resulting lead oxides from fouling the engine, gasoline was treated with 1,2-Dibromoethane, which converted lead oxides into the more volatile lead bromide, which was then exhausted from the engine into the environment.

Safety
Like other compounds containing lead, lead(II) bromide is categorized as probably carcinogenic to humans (Category 2A), by the International Agency for Research on Cancer (IARC).  Its release into the environment as a product of leaded gasoline was highly controversial.

References

Lead(II) compounds
Bromides
Metal halides